The César Award for Best Actress in a Supporting Role (French: César de la meilleure actrice dans un second rôle) is one of the César Awards, presented annually by the Académie des Arts et Techniques du Cinéma to recognize the outstanding performance in a supporting role of an actress who has worked within the French film industry during the year preceding the ceremony. Nominees and winner are selected via a run-off voting by all the members of the Académie.

History

Superlatives

As of 2019, 137 actresses have been nominated in the category, with a total of 34 different winners. The average age at first nomination is 41 and the average age of winners at first win is 38.

With three wins (1991, 1993, 1999), Dominique Blanc holds the record of most César Award for Best Supporting Actress. Eight actresses have won the César twice: Marie-France Pisier (1976, 1977), Nathalie Baye (1981, 1982), Suzanne Flon (1984, 1990), Annie Girardot (1996, 2002), Valérie Lemercier (1994, 2007), Julie Depardieu (2004, 2008), Anne Alvaro (2001, 2011) and Karin Viard (2003, 2019).

Marie-France Pisier and Nathalie Baye have won their two awards in consecutive years. Along with Adèle Haenel, they are the only three performers to have won two competitive acting César in a row. Including her Best Actress César won in 1983, Nathalie Baye is also the only performer to have won an acting César in three consecutive years, in 1981, 1982 and 1983.

Noémie Lvovsky and Karin Viard tie for the record of most nominations with 6, Lvovsky also holding the record of most nominations without ever winning the award. Stéphane Audran holds the record of most consecutive nominations with 3 (1982, 1983, 1984).

Nine women have won both the César Award for Best Supporting Actress and the César Award for Best Actress:
 Nathalie Baye (Best Supporting Actress in 1981 and 1982, Best Actress in 1983 and 2006),
 Annie Girardot (Best Actress in 1977, Best Supporting Actress in 1996 and 2002),
 Dominique Blanc (Best Supporting Actress in 1991, 1993 and 1999, Best Actress in 2001),
 Karin Viard (Best Actress in 2000, Best Supporting Actress in 2003 and 2019),
 Marion Cotillard (Best Supporting Actress in 2005, Best Actress in 2008),
 Emmanuelle Devos (Best Actress in 2002, Best Supporting Actress in 2010),
 Adèle Haenel (Best Supporting Actress in 2014, Best Actress in 2015),
 Catherine Frot (Best Supporting Actress in 1997, Best Actress in 2016).
 Fanny Ardant (Best Actress in 1997, Best Supporting Actress in 2020),

Nathalie Baye is the only actress with multiple wins in both categories.

Three films have received both accolades: One Deadly Summer in 1984 (Best Actress to Isabelle Adjani, Best Supporting Actress to Suzanne Flon), Indochine in 1993 (Best Actress to Catherine Deneuve, Best Supporting Actress to Dominique Blanc) and Queen Margot in 1995 (Best Actress to Isabelle Adjani, Best Supporting Actress to Virna Lisi).

Three women have won the César Award for Best Supporting Actress after previously winning the César Award for Most Promising Actress:
 Charlotte Gainsbourg (Most Promising Actress in 1986, Best Supporting Actress in 2000),
 Julie Depardieu (Most Promising Actress in 2004, Best Supporting Actress in 2004 and 2008),
 Cécile de France (Most Promising Actress in 2003, Best Supporting Actress in 2006).

Both Cécile de France and Julie Depardieu have won their two awards with a same role: Isabelle, an Erasmus student, in The Spanish Apartment (Most Promising Actress) and its sequel The Russian Dolls (Best Supporting Actress) for de France, and Jeanne-Marie in Little Lili (both awards) for Depardieu.

Therefore, Depardieu is the only individual to have won two acting César for the same performance. This achievement is no longer possible as the Académie has since modified nomination rules to ensure that no individual could be nominated in more than one acting category (Best Actor/Actress or Best Supporting Actor/Actress or Most Promising Actor/Actress) for the same film.

Three films has received both accolades: An Impudent Girl in 1986 (Best Supporting Actress to Bernadette Lafont, Most Promising Actress to Charlotte Gainsbourg), Life Is a Long Quiet River in 1989 (Best Supporting Actress to Hélène Vincent, Most Promising Actress to Catherine Jacob) and Little Lili in 2004 (both awards to Julie Depardieu).

Thirteen women have received nominations in the three competitive acting categories: Best Actress, Best Supporting Actress and Most Promising Actress. They are Emmanuelle Béart, Charlotte Gainsbourg, Dominique Blanc, Anne Brochet, Karin Viard, Sandrine Kiberlain, Emmanuelle Devos, Cécile de France, Marion Cotillard, Sylvie Testud, Emilie Dequenne, Sara Forestier and Adèle Haenel. So far, no actress has achieved to win the three awards.

To date, the most long-lived winner is Suzanne Flon, who died at 87, and the most short-lived is Valérie Benguigui, who died at 47. The oldest alive winner is Hélène Vincent, aged 75, and the earliest alive winner is Nicole Garcia (Le Cavaleur, 1980).

International presence
As the César Awards are centered on the French Cinema, the majority of recipients are French and performed in French language. However, the Best Supporting Actress César has been awarded five times to a non-French actress:
 in 1995 to Italian actress Virna Lisi for her performance in Queen Margot;
 in 2006 to Belgian actress Cécile de France for her performance in The Russian Dolls;
 in 2012 to Spanish actress Carmen Maura for her performance in The Women on the 6th Floor;
 in 2015 to American actress Kristen Stewart for her performance in Clouds of Sils Maria;
 in 2016 to Danish actress Sidse Babett Knudsen for her performance in Courted.

The Best Supporting Actress César has been awarded only once for a full foreign-language performance with Kristen Stewart's English-language performance. Nevertheless, Virna Lisi's and Carmen Maura's roles included some parts of Italian-language and Spanish-language, respectively.

International actresses who have received nominations are:
 Belgium: Emilie Dequenne, Cécile de France, Virginie Efira (she holds dual Belgian-French citizenship),
 Canada: Francine Racette, Charlotte Le Bon,
 Denmark: Sidse Babett Knudsen,
 Italy: Virna Lisi,
 Netherlands: Maruschka Detmers,
 Spain: Victoria Abril, Carmen Maura,
 Switzerland: Nelly Borgeaud,
 United Kingdom: Jane Birkin, Jacqueline Bisset, Charlotte Rampling, Kelly Reilly,
 United States: Kristen Stewart.

Winners and nominees
Following the AATC's practice, the films below are listed by year of ceremony, which corresponds to the year following the film's year of release. For example, the César for Best Supporting Actress of 2010 was awarded on February 27, 2010 for a performance in a film released between January 1, 2009 and December 31, 2009.

Actresses are selected via a two-round vote: first round to choose the nominees, second round to designate the winner. All the members of the Académie, without regard to their branch, are eligible to vote on both rounds. Initially set to four, the number of nominees was expanded to five in 1984.

Winners are listed first in bold, followed by the other nominees in alphabetic order.

1970s

1980s

1990s

2000s

2010s

2020s

Multiple wins and nominations

The following individuals received two or more Best Supporting Actress awards: 

The following individuals received three or more Best Supporting Actress nominations:

See also
Academy Award for Best Supporting Actress
BAFTA Award for Best Actress in a Supporting Role

References

External links 
  
 César Award for Best Supporting Actress at AlloCiné

Actress in supporting role
 
Film awards for supporting actress